The Resolution on Taiwan's Future is a document ratified by the Democratic Progressive Party (DPP) during its eighth annual national assembly on May 7–8, 1999 in the southern port-city of Kaohsiung. It signifies a milestone of the position of the DPP toward Taiwan's future, and is the source of principles of the Government of the Republic of China under the rule of the DPP.

Development
On 20 October 2001, the DPP passed a resolution elevating the status of the "1999 resolution regarding Taiwan's future"in other words an attempt at making this resolution technically replace the DPP party charter's "Taiwan independence clause."

See also
 Cross-Strait relations
 Four-Stage Theory of the Republic of China
 Political status of Taiwan
 Taiwanese nationalism
 Taiwan independence movement

References

External links
 Taiwan Democratic Progressive Party

Democratic Progressive Party
Taiwan independence movement
1999 in Taiwan
1999 documents